, also known as SGS, is a Japanese company headquartered in Tokyo, Japan, that offers IT services.

Overview
Originally, in 1988, Sony System Designs Inc. was established by Sony Corporation
.
In 2001, the company name changed to Sony Information System Solutions Inc..
In 2003, Sony Corporation acquired CIS Inc., then  Sony Information System Solutions Inc. and CIS Inc. were merged, and the company name changed to Sony Global Solutions Inc.

.

The company offers the services of system integration, cloud computing, information security, and provides computer software mainly for Sony group.

Sony Global Solutions is known that the company collaborates other IT service companies, Accenture, NS Solutions, etc.

.

See also
 List of companies of Japan
 List of Sony subsidiaries

References

External links
 Official website

Cloud computing providers
Computer security companies
Information technology consulting firms of Japan
Service companies based in Tokyo
Sony subsidiaries
Consulting firms established in 1988
Japanese companies established in 1988